Saint-Avold (Lorraine Franconian: Sänt Avuur) is a commune in the Moselle department in Grand Est in north-eastern France.

It is situated twenty-eight miles (45 km) east of Metz, France and seventeen miles (27 km) southwest of Saarbrücken, Germany.

History
The Saint-Avold area has frequently suffered invasions and since the nineteenth century has been controlled alternately by German and French authorities.

The original Abbey of Saint Nabor began as an oratory for a sixth-century monastery. Gradually a complex developed after it received the relics of Saint Nabor, and the church was rebuilt in the eighteenth century, in part following Baroque style. It was designated as a basilica.

During the French Revolution, the monastery and church suffered extensive damage; the cloisters were destroyed. The ancient parish church was sacrificed in exchange for keeping Saint Nabor. The abbey also suffered bombing damage during World War II, but much of the church has been restored.

The Saint-Avold Synagogue is a Jewish synagogue near Place Paul-Collin. The current synagogue building, completed in 1956, replaces a nearby synagogue which was also destroyed during World War II.

Population

Lorraine American Cemetery

Just north of the town is the site of Europe's largest United States' World War II military cemetery, the Lorraine American Cemetery and Memorial, with the graves of 10,489 American soldiers who died during World War II. Most of the men were killed during the United States' drive to expel German forces from the fortress city of Metz toward the Siegfried Line and the Rhine River. The soldiers were mostly from the U.S. Seventh Army's Infantry and Armored divisions and its cavalry groups.

Climate
Climate in this area has mild differences between highs and lows, and there is adequate rainfall year-round.  The Köppen Climate Classification subtype for this climate is "Cfb" (Marine West Coast Climate/Oceanic climate).

Sister cities

Notable people
 Louis Aloyse Risse (1850–1925), engineer born in Saint-Avold who designed the Grand Concourse in the Bronx in New York.
 Erich Isselhorst, (1906–1948), Nazi war criminal, executed in Strasbourg in 1948
 Adrienne Thomas (1897–1980), novelist.
 Umut Bozok, (1996–), footballer

See also
 Communes of the Moselle department

References

External links

History of Saint Avold
Saint-Avold, France Web site
Photo of Saint Nabor Basilica
Sociéte d'Histoire du Pays Naborien

Saintavold
Moselle communes articles needing translation from French Wikipedia
Duchy of Lorraine